The 2017 AAA Texas 500 was a Monster Energy NASCAR Cup Series race which was held on November 5, 2017, at Texas Motor Speedway in Fort Worth, Texas. Contested over 334 laps on the 1.5 mile (2.4 km) intermediate quad-oval, it was the 34th race of the 2017 Monster Energy NASCAR Cup Series season, eighth race of the Playoffs, and second race of the Round of 8.

Report

Background

Texas Motor Speedway is a speedway located in the northernmost portion of the U.S. city of Fort Worth, Texas – the portion located in Denton County, Texas. The track measures  around and is banked 24 degrees in the turns, and is of the oval design, where the front straightaway juts outward slightly. The track layout is similar to Atlanta Motor Speedway and Charlotte Motor Speedway (formerly Lowe's Motor Speedway). The track is owned by Speedway Motorsports, Inc., the same company that owns Atlanta and Charlotte Motor Speedways, as well as the short-track Bristol Motor Speedway.

Entry list

Daniel Hemric filled in for Menard for Qualifying, First and Second Practices as Menard and his wife, Jennifer, welcomed their second child that week.

First practice

Qualifying

Qualifying results

Practice (post-qualifying)

Second practice

Final practice

Race

Race results

Stage results

Stage 1
Laps: 85

Stage 2
Laps: 85

Final stage results

Stage 3
Laps: 164

Race statistics
 Lead changes: 13 among different drivers
 Cautions/Laps: 8 for 40
 Red flags: 1 for 10 minutes and 29 seconds
 Time of race: 3 hours, 29 minutes, 52 seconds
 Average speed:

Media

Television
NBCSN covered the race on the television side. Rick Allen and Dale Jarrett had the call in the regular booth for the race. Two–time Texas winner Jeff Burton and Steve Letarte had the call in the NBC's Stock Car Smarts Booth for the race. Dave Burns, Marty Snider and Kelli Stavast reported from pit lane during the race.

Radio
PRN had the radio call for the race, which was simulcast on Sirius XM NASCAR Radio.

Standings after the race

Drivers' Championship standings

Manufacturers' Championship standings

Note: Only the first 16 positions are included for the driver standings.

References

2017 in sports in Texas
AAA Texas 500
NASCAR races at Texas Motor Speedway
AAA Texas 500